The 8th Virginia Cavalry Regiment was a cavalry regiment raised in Virginia for service in the Confederate States Army during the American Civil War. It fought mostly as part of the Army of Northern Virginia.

Virginia's 8th Cavalry Regiment was organized early in 1862 with nine companies but increased its number to eleven to July. Many of the men were recruited in Cabell, Wayne, Mercer, Fayette, Greenbrier, Bland, Smyth, Nelson, Kanawha, and Tazewell counties.

The unit confronted the Union in western Virginia, fought in East Tennessee then returned to western Virginia. Later it participated in Early's Shenandoah Valley operations and the Appomattox Campaign.

This regiment contained 225 effectives in April, 1864. Some claim that none were included in the surrender at Appomattox because it had cut through the Federal lines and disbanded, and that the field officers were Colonels James M. Corns and Walter H. Jenifer; Lieutenant Colonels Thomas P. Bowen, A.F. Cook, Henry Fitzhugh, and Albert G. Jenkins; and Major P.M. Edmondson. However, 2nd Lt. Hezekiah Harmon of Company A swore as a witness to the pension application of Angelina James, widow of S.P. James of the same company, that he and James surrendered at Appomattox on April 9, 1865, and that he "was present and saw all that I have stated".  Validating Harmon's statement is the statement of the Adjutant General of the War Department of the United States, Brigadier General George Andrews, on November 21, 1912, on Angelina James' pension application, that "the records show that one S.P. James (not found as Stephen Porter James), private, Company A, 8th Virginia Cavalry, Confederate States Army, was enlisted June 27, 1863; that he was surrendered at Appomattox Court House, Virginia, and was paroled at that place April 9, 1865."  This evidence lends strong weight to the 8th Cavalry having been at Appomattox at the surrender.

Former U.S. Congressman and Confederate Congressman Albert G. Jenkins recruited one of the unit's companies as a company of partisan rangers, before it was attached to the regiment and he became commanding officer of the 8th Virginia.  He was killed at the Battle of Cloyd's Mountain.

Companies and officers

See also

List of Virginia Civil War units
List of West Virginia Civil War Confederate units

References

External links
 War-Time Reminiscences of James D. Sedinger, Company E, 8th Virginia Cavalry (Border Rangers)

Units and formations of the Confederate States Army from Virginia
1862 establishments in Virginia
1865 disestablishments in Virginia
Military units and formations established in 1862
Military units and formations disestablished in 1865